Auranga River may refer to:

Auranga River (Jharkhand)
Auranga River (Gujarat)